Pendzhi (Pənceh) is a rural locality (a selo) in Kheli-Penzhinsky Selsoviet, Tabasaransky District, Republic of Dagestan, Russia. The population was 314 as of 2010.

Geography 
Pendzhi is located 12 km east of Khuchni (the district's administrative centre) by road. Yekrag is the nearest rural locality.

References 

Rural localities in Tabasaransky District